Wojak (from Polish  , loosely 'soldier' or 'fighter'), also known as Feels Guy, is an Internet meme that is, in its original form, a simple, black-outlined cartoon drawing of a bald man with a wistful expression. The origin of the Wojak illustration is unknown. It may have emerged in 2009 on a Polish imageboard named vichan, from where it was later reposted to the German imageboard krautchan in 2010 by a poster called "wojak".   

The meme subsequently grew in popularity on 4chan, where the character became associated with the phrases formerly used by wojak such as "I know that feel, bro", "that feel" or "that feel when".

History

The earliest currently known "Wojak" is the nickname of a Polish user on the English-speaking board /int/ of the defunct German imageboard Krautchan, who started posting the image around 2010, often accompanied with lament about not having a girlfriend. According to him, the image originally came from the Polish imageboard vichan, where it was posted with the filename "ciepła twarz.jpg" (from Polish 'warm face'). Brian Feldman of Intelligencer describes the meme Wojak's expression as "pained but dealing with it".

The image spread to other imageboards, including 4chan, where by 2011 an image of two Wojaks hugging each other under the caption "I know that feel bro" gained popularity. 

Wojak was also paired with the template phrase "that feel" or "that feel when", shortened to "tfw". 

Some variants paired him with the character Pepe the Frog (catchphrase "feels good man/feels bad man") in what Feldman describes as a "platonic romance within the memescape".

Variants

NPC

In October 2018, a Wojak with a gray face, pointy nose and blank, emotionless facial expression, dubbed "NPC Wojak", became a popular visual representation for people who cannot think for themselves or make their own decisions, comparing them to non-player characters – computer-automated characters within a video game.
NPC Wojak has gained online notoriety.
The meme gained media attention, initially in Kotaku and The New York Times, due to its usage in parodying the supposed herd mentality of American liberals.
This usage of the meme has been attributed to Donald Trump supporters.
About 1,500 Twitter accounts falsely posing as liberal activists with the NPC meme as a profile picture were suspended for allegedly spreading misinformation about the 2018 United States elections.
On January 13, 2019, a conservative art collective known as "The Faction" hijacked a billboard for Real Time with Bill Maher, replacing Maher's image with that of the NPC Wojak.

Coomer 
In November 2019, the "Coomer" Wojak picked up in popularity with the "No Nut November" trend. The Coomer depicts a smiling Wojak edit with unkempt hair, red rimmed eyes, and an untidy beard. This Wojak is sometimes depicted with a skinny frame, and a large, muscular right arm resulting from excessive masturbation. It is generally understood to represent someone with a pornography addiction. Much of this meme's popularity can be attributed to the "Coomer Pledge", a viral internet trend which dared people to abstain from masturbation for all of November, and change their profile picture to an image of the Coomer if they were to fail.

Doomer 

The doomer is an image macro and character archetype that first appeared on 4chan. The image typically depicts Wojak wearing a black watch cap and a black hooded sweatshirt, with dark circles under his eyes, while smoking a cigarette. The archetype often embodies nihilism, clinical depression, hopelessness, and despair, with a belief in the incipient end of the world to causes ranging from climate apocalypse, to peak oil, to alcoholism, to (more locally) opioid addiction. The meme first appeared on 4chan's /r9k/ board in September 2018.

A related meme format, "doomer girl", began appearing on 4chan in January 2020, and it soon moved to other online communities, including Reddit and Tumblr, often by women claiming it from its 4chan origins. This format is described by The Atlantic as "a quickly sketched cartoon woman with black hair, black clothes, and sad eyes ringed with red makeup". The doomer girl character is often associated with the e-girl and alternative subcultures. The character often appears in image macros interacting with the original doomer character. The format is often compared to rage comics.

Soyjak 
Soyjak, a portmanteau of "soy" and "wojak", is a variation of Wojak that combines Wojak-style illustrations with features of a soy boy or "nu-male". It is typically used in online discourse, such as on 4chan and various other sites and imageboards, to mock an opponent's position by quoting them alongside a Soyjak image. The first example of Soyjak appeared in December 2017 on 4chan's /int/ board. It quickly gained notoriety on the site, spawning many edits and variants, commonly mocking interests associated with "soy boys", including use of sites such as Reddit or 9gag, playing Nintendo Switch, or cuckoldry, among other things. Soyjaks usually have large open mouths. Aside from the original Soyjak variant, a Wojak edit with glasses and a scraggly beard, it became popular to trace real-life people perceived to fit the "soy boy" stereotype.

A community has gathered around Soyjaks since 2020, first on the /qa/ board on 4chan, soon leading to the creation of its own imageboard soyjak.party after the aforementioned board was locked. Soyjak.party currently servers over 2,240,000 posts and has a booru dedicated to mostly right wing oriented obscene images the denizens of the site create, containing over 29,350 images and videos as of March 15th 2023.

See also
 Polandball – another meme which originated on Krautchan to make fun of the user Wojak before spreading to the English-speaking world.
 Rage comic – a similar meme which also uses copies of black-and-white Microsoft Paint illustrations.
 Meme Man – a 3D render of a face often used in surreal memes and reaction images.

References

External links 

 
 
 A Wojak collection at the Internet Archive
 Wojak Paradise: A Wojak Gallery

4chan phenomena
Internet memes
Internet memes introduced in 2010
2010 drawings
2010s fads and trends
2020s fads and trends